2-Acetylfuran is a low melting solid or high boiling liquid, depending on temperature. The solid melts at 30 °C and has a density of 1.0975 g/ml at 20 °C, while the normal boiling point of the liquid is 168–169 °C. 2-Acetylfuran is a useful intermediate in the synthesis of fine chemicals and pharmaceuticals, and is used in the production of the generic cephalophosphorin antibiotic cefuroxime.

Synthesis 

2-Acetylfuran was prepared by Ashina in 1914 via the reaction of the methyl Grignard reagent on 2-furonitrile.
Modern industrial synthesis generally involves the Friedel–Crafts acylation of furan with acetic anhydride.

Applications

Pharmaceuticals

A one-pot synthesis of  an intermediate to the HIV integrase inhibitor S-1360 was based on the Friedel-Crafts alkylation of 2-acetylfuran with 4-fluorobenzyl chloride using zinc chloride catalyst.

Reaction of 2-acetylfuran with aqueous sodium nitrite gave 2-furanyloxoacetic acid, an intermediate to Cefuroxime, a second-generation cephalosporin antibiotic.

See also
Isomaltol - same core, with a hydroxy group in the 3-position
2-Furoic acid

References 

2-Furyl compounds